The 2017–18 Michigan Wolverines men's basketball team represented the University of Michigan during the 2017–18 NCAA Division I men's basketball season. The Wolverines, led by head coach John Beilein in his 11th year, played their home games for the 51st consecutive year at the Crisler Center in Ann Arbor, Michigan. This season marked the program's 102nd season and its 101st consecutive year as a member of the Big Ten Conference.

The entering class included 2017 Michigan Gatorade Player of the Year and Mr. Basketball of Michigan Isaiah Livers. Kentucky transfer Charles Matthews became eligible to play this season after sitting out the 2016–17 NCAA Division I men's basketball season, while graduate transfer Jaaron Simmons became eligible to play immediately. The departing class included graduating seniors Zak Irvin and Derrick Walton who had completed their eligibility, and graduating seniors Mark Donnal and Andrew Dakich. In addition, D. J. Wilson declared for the 2017 NBA draft with two years of eligibility remaining. Jeff Meyer and Billy Donlon also departed prior to the season to take assistant coaching positions at Butler and Northwestern, respectively, and were replaced by DeAndre Haynes and Luke Yaklich.

During the regular season, the team finished tied for fourth in the Big Ten Conference. They earned a 5th seed in the 2018 Big Ten Conference men's basketball tournament, where they won the championship, thus defending the title won by the 2016–17 Wolverines in the 2017 Big Ten Conference men's basketball tournament the year before. The Wolverines finished the season with a 33–8 record, setting a program record for wins during a season. The team earned the third seed in the 2018 NCAA Division I men's basketball tournament and reached the Championship Game before losing to Villanova.

Departures
Zak Irvin and Derrick Walton graduated during their senior seasons for the 2016–17 Michigan Wolverines men's basketball team. Mark Donnal and Andrew Dakich graduated with one year of eligibility remaining, which they could use under the graduate transfer rule to play elsewhere. Donnal committed to play with the Clemson Tigers. Dakich committed to play with the Quinnipiac Bobcats, but could not gain acceptance into his preferred graduate program. Dakich announced in July that he had committed to play with the Ohio State Buckeyes. On June 20, Michigan assistant coach and former Butler Bulldogs assistant coach Jeff Meyer left the program to join former Michigan assistant coach LaVall Jordan's staff at Butler. On June 26, Chicagoan and assistant coach Billy Donlon left the program to become an assistant under long-time friend Chris Collins at Northwestern. On October 11, Fred Wright-Jones left the team, but remained at Michigan as a student on a full academic scholarship.

Preseason
In April 2017, some early pollsters included Michigan among the expected preseason top 25 teams: ESPN (#22), and Sports Illustrated (#23). However, most early polls omitted the team: Yahoo!, USA Today, NBC Sports, CBS Sports, Sporting News and Bleacher Report. At the time, ESPN's Eamonn Brennan felt it was a "foregone conclusion" that D. J. Wilson would declare for the 2017 NBA draft, with Sports Illustrated projecting him as a first round selection. On April 10, both D. J. Wilson and Moe Wagner declared for the 2017 NBA draft, but did not hire agents, which gave them until May 24 to withdraw their names and retain their athletic eligibility to return to Michigan. On April 25, Ohio grad transfer Jaaron Simmons announced that if he did not remain entered in the 2017 NBA draft, he would transfer to Michigan. Simmons, a 2017 first team All-Mid-American Conference honoree who averaged 15.9 points and 6.5 assists in 2016–17, had declared for the draft without hiring an agent on March 28. On April 30, Jeff Goodman of ESPN reported that Wagner and Wilson were invited to the NBA draft combine and Walton was named as an alternate. On May 23, the addition of Simmons as a graduate transfer was made official as Simmons removed himself from the NBA draft process. On May 24, Wagner withdrew his name from the NBA draft and Wilson did not. Following the deadline for returning to college and its announcements, Michigan was not ranked by some media outlets, including ESPN, CBS Sports, NBC Sports, USA Today, Fox Sports, and Yahoo! Sports,

In the fall preseason, Wagner was selected to the 10-man preseason All-Big Ten team. He was also one of two Big Ten players named to the 21-man Karl Malone Award watchlist. He was a preseason John R. Wooden Award and Naismith College Player of the Year watchlist honoree.

2017–18 recruits and personnel
On October 23, 2015, four-star recruit Jordan Poole became the first commitment for the Class of 2017 after home gym visit from Beilein and assistant coach Jordan and multiple Michigan campus visits. Poole had several competing offers including Illinois, Indiana, Nebraska, Memphis, Marquette, and Auburn. As a junior, Poole was a 2016 WBCA All-State Boys Basketball first team selection. On June 20, 2016, reports confirmed that Michigan had recruited Kentucky transfer Charles Matthews, who played his freshman season for the 2015–16 Kentucky Wildcats. Matthews would have to sit out the 2016–17 season. Michigan confirmed the story on July 1. The same day, Poole announced that he would transfer from Rufus King High School in Wisconsin to La Lumiere School in Indiana where he would experience a campus lifestyle, play a schedule with several ESPN broadcasts, and be teamed up with unsigned class of 2017 prospects Brian Bowen and Jeremiah Tilmon. On July 19, Spring Grove Area High School point guard Eli Brooks committed to Michigan over offers such as defending national champion Villanova, Ohio State, N.C. State, Temple and Kansas State. On August 7, 2016 Isaiah Livers committed to Michigan over contenders Michigan State, Butler, Minnesota, California and Boston College. On July 15, 2017, it was announced that Naji Ozeir would join the Michigan basketball team as a preferred walk-on. Ozeir, who had an offer withstanding from Wayne State to play on scholarship, had previously played for the Lebanese under-17 national basketball team in the 2015 Arab National Cup. Luke Wilson was added to the roster as a preferred walk-on on September 1, 2017. On the morning of the season-opening exhibition game, the team announced that student manager C. J. Baird would be elevated to the roster. In December, the team added Rico Ozuna-Harrison, who had been practicing with the team since walk-on tryouts in October, to the roster. Ozuna-Harrison had been a captain for the 2017 Cass Tech team that won the school's first Detroit Public School League title since 1998.

Livers was named 2017 Michigan Gatorade Player of the Year and Mr. Basketball of Michigan. He is Michigan's 11th Mr. Basketball of Michigan, but the first since Manny Harris in 2007. Poole was a member of the 2017 Dick's National High School Champion La Lumiere team.

On August 4, 2017, Michigan announced that it had hired Luke Yaklich and DeAndre Haynes away from the Illinois State Redbirds to serve as assistant coaches. At the same time, the team promoted Chris Hunter from director of player personnel to director of basketball operations.

Future recruits

2018–19
On December 22, 2016, junior recruit David DeJulius became the first commitment for the Class of 2018 after receiving a December 17 offer following his career-high 46-point, 7-rebound, 5-assist performance of December 17 in leading East English Village Preparatory Academy over Dakota High School. Brandon Johns became the second commitment for the Class of 2018 when he committed to Michigan on June 29, 2017, over several other schools including hometown Michigan State, along with fellow Big Ten universities Indiana, Iowa, and Purdue. At the time of his commitment, Johns was considered by several recruiting sites, such as 24/7Sports as well as ESPN, as the top recruit from Michigan in the Class of 2018.

In mid-June 2017, junior recruit Taylor Currie committed to Michigan, becoming, at the time, their first commitment for the Class of 2019. Two weeks later, Currie announced that he would be reclassifying and would be set to join the Class of 2018 marking the third member of the class. On September 22, 2017, Ignas Brazdeikis became the fourth; at that time he was ranked in the top 50 in the 24/7Sports composite top 100 rankings for recruits of the class of 2018. Brazdeikis committed to Michigan over schools such as Vanderbilt and Florida. On September 29, 2017, Currie decommitted from Michigan, dropping the amount of 2018 recruits to three. On October 2, 2017, Adrien Nunez became the fourth member of the 2018 recruiting class. Nunez received much attention over the summer scouting period and drew praise for his shooting ability; he committed to Michigan over schools such as Penn State, Texas A&M, and Boston College. In October, Michigan added its fifth recruit to the 2018 recruiting class with the addition of Colin Castleton, who selected Michigan over Illinois. Castleton noted his connection with new Michigan assistant coach Luke Yaklich as a driving force behind communication with Michigan.

Johns and DeJulius finished second (2,792 points) and third (2,542), respectively, to Michigan State recruit Foster Loyer (3,691) in the 2018 Mr. Basketball of Michigan voting. All five finalists were Big Ten conference recruits (Michigan-2, Michigan State-2, Purdue-1). Brazdeikis repeated as the Ontario Scholastic Basketball Association MVP in 2018 after earning the award in 2017.

Regular season

November
Michigan began the season with a victory over North Florida. Although the game was tied with 11:03 remaining, Michigan won 86–66. Michigan was led by Duncan Robinson with a game-high 21 points, while Charles Matthews posted 20 points in his Michigan debut, marking the first time Michigan had two 20-point scorers since March 3, 2015. On November 13, Michigan defeated Central Michigan 72–65. Michigan had five double-digit scorers, including Muhammad-Ali Abdur-Rahkman who led the team with 17 points and Moe Wagner who contributed his second consecutive double-double, and third of his career. With seven lead changes in the game, Michigan took the lead for good with 8:47 remaining. On November 16, Jon Teske, who had previous career highs of four points and three rebounds, led Michigan with a 10-point, 11-rebound double-double as Michigan overcame its third second-half deficit in three games against Southern Miss.

In the first round of the 2017 Maui Invitational Tournament (its fifth) on November 20, against Louisiana State, Michigan overcame an eight-point deficit with 12 minutes remaining to take a nine-point lead with five minutes remaining only to lose 75–77. In the consolation bracket, Michigan defeated  the next day on the strength of Matthews' first career double-double (22 points and 10 rebounds). Michigan set or tied school single-game tournament records in scoring margin (38), field-goal percentage (64.9), assists (22), three-pointers made (15), three-point attempts (28), three-point percentage (53.6), steals (nine), turnover low (eight) and blocks (six). On November 22, Michigan defeated Virginia Commonwealth (VCU) 68–60, earning a fifth-place finish in the Maui Invitational Tournament. Michigan was led by Robinson with a game-high 18 points. Michigan trailed by three points with two minutes remaining, before the Wolverines outscored VCU 11–0 down the stretch.  On November 26, Michigan defeated UC Riverside  87–42 on the strength of double-doubles by Wagner (21 points, 10 rebounds) and Matthews (17 points, 12 assists). It was the team's first pair of double-doubles in a game since Glenn Robinson III and Trey Burke did so for the 2012–13 National Runner-up Wolverines on January 6, 2013. On November 29, Michigan lost to (#13 AP Poll/#11 Coaches Poll) North Carolina 71–86 in the ACC–Big Ten Challenge. Michigan was led by Wagner with a team-high 20 points. This was the first meeting between the two teams since the 1993 NCAA Division I Men's Basketball Championship Game.

December
The 2018 Big Ten tournament was held at Madison Square Garden in New York City. Due to the Big East's use of that venue for the 2018 Big East tournament, the Big Ten tournament took place one week earlier than usual, ending the week before Selection Sunday. As a result, each team played one road game and one home conference game in the first week of December.

On December 2, Michigan defeated Indiana 69–55 in its Big Ten conference opener. Jordan Poole led the team with a career-high 19 points, while Muhammad-Ali Abdur Rahkman added eight points and a career-high 11 rebounds, and Eli Brooks added five points and a career-high six assists. Two days later, Michigan lost to Ohio State 62–71, after leading by as many as 20 points with 1:31 remaining in the first half. Michigan was led by Wagner with a team-high 14 points, and one rebound shy of a double-double. On December 9, Michigan defeated UCLA 78–69 in overtime. Michigan trailed by 15 points with 14:48 remaining in regulation, and tied the game with 10.9 seconds left to force overtime. Michigan was led by Wagner with a team-high 23-points, while Matthews added 20 points, marking the second time this season Michigan had two 20-point scorers in a game. Michigan forced 20 UCLA turnovers, with 12 coming off of steals. Zavier Simpson set a career-high with four steals, while Robinson tied a career-high with four steals. Michigan won despite shooting 8-for-22 on its free throws (including 2-for-13 by Wagner and Matthews), but Eli Brooks converted the two game-tying free throws when it mattered. Muhammad-Ali Abdur Rahkman's first career double-double (17 points and 10 rebounds), helped Michigan defeat Texas 59–52 on December 12. Michigan remained ahead of Texas for the final 35:36 of the game, although Wagner injured his ankle with 7:36 remaining. On December 16, Michigan defeated Detroit 90–58. Michigan was led by Matthews with a game-high 20 points, while Jon Teske made his first collegiate start and recorded his second career double-double (15 points and 10 rebounds). The game marked the first collegiate basketball game at Little Caesars Arena. Detroit was coached by former Michigan assistant coach Bacari Alexander and was led by former Wolverine Kameron Chatman who posted 18 points and 13 rebounds. On December 21, Michigan handed winless Alabama A&M Bulldogs a 97–47 defeat behind a career-high 31 points by Matthews, who became the first Michigan player to score 30 points since Aubrey Dawkins in March 2015. Michigan forced a season-high 25 turnovers. On December 30 Michigan defeated Jacksonville 76–51 in Wagner's return to the lineup. Abdur-Rahkman posted his first 20-point performance of the season on 7-for-7 shooting from the field.

January
On January 2, 2018, Michigan defeated Iowa 75–68. Simpson and Abdur-Rahkman led scoring with 15 points each, while Isaiah Livers added a career-high 13 points. On January 6, Michigan defeated Illinois 79–69 as six players reached double figures. Wagner led the way with 14 points and a season-high-tying three blocks in his first double digit scoring effort since his injury. It was the first time Michigan had six players reach double figures since a 2017 contest against Indiana. On January 9, Michigan lost to (#5 AP Poll/#7 Coaches Poll) Purdue 69–70, ending their seven-game winning streak. Michigan was led by Simpson with a career-tying 15 points and career-high six rebounds. After trailing by as many as 14 points in the first half, Michigan took its first lead following back-to-back triples from Simpson with 4:30 remaining in the second half. Vincent Edwards then tied the game at 69 with 2:28 remaining in the game. The game remained tied until the final four seconds when Isaac Haas made his first free throw attempt to give Purdue the win. On January 13, Isaiah Livers replaced Duncan Robinson in the starting lineup, as Michigan won their rivalry game against (#4 AP Poll/#4 Coaches Poll) Michigan State 82–72. Wagner led the Wolverines with a career-high 27 points. There were 13 lead changes and 11 ties throughout the game. The win marked their first victory on the road against a top-five ranked team since defeating (#3 AP Poll/#3 Coaches Poll) Michigan State on January 25, 2014; it was also first win at Breslin Center since 2014.

Following the win, Michigan entered the 2017–18 basketball rankings for the first time on January 15 at #23 AP Poll and #24 Coaches Poll. On January 15, Michigan defeated Maryland 68–67. After trailing by 14 points in the first half and 10 points at halftime, Michigan scored the first ten points of the second half in 3:02 of play and built up a 10-point lead with 5:50 remaining. However, Maryland eventually posted a go-ahead three-point shot with three seconds remaining, before Abdur-Rahkman recorded two free throws with 1.2 seconds remaining, giving him exactly 1,000 career points and the Wolverines the win. Michigan was led by Wagner with 18 points and 11 rebounds for his fourth double-double of the season. Other Michigan highlights included seven consecutive three-point shots. On January 18, Michigan lost to Nebraska 52–72, the Cornhuskers first win over the Wolverines since 1964, snapping Michigan's 10-game winning streak against them. Matthews led the team with 15 points, and eight rebounds. The 20-point loss was Michigan's most lopsided defeat against a Big Ten opponent since losing to Michigan State by 23 points in February 2013.

On January 21, Michigan defeated Rutgers 62–47. Michigan was led by Wagner with 16 points, while Simpson added 10 points and a career-high eight rebounds. Michigan's defense held Rutgers to just 47 points, 22.5 points below its 69.5 points per game average. During the game the 1967–68 team was honored as the first team to play at the Crisler Center, as part of arena's 50th anniversary celebrations. On January 25, Michigan lost to (#3 AP Poll/#3 Coaches Poll) Purdue 88–92. Michigan was led by Abdur-Rahkman with a then career-high 26 points. There were 24 lead changes and five ties during the game. On January 29, Michigan defeated Northwestern 58–47. After falling behind 19–11 early in the first half, Michigan held Northwestern without a point for over 10 minutes and held on for a victory due in part to a season-low five turnovers, while forcing 16 Northwestern turnovers. Michigan was led by Matthews with a team-high 14 points, seven rebounds and a career-high three steals, while Poole added eight points and a career-high three assists.

February
On February 3, Michigan defeated Minnesota 76–73 in overtime. Wagner (16 points, 10 rebounds) and Matthews (13 points, 11 rebounds) both posted double-doubles, marking the second time this season Michigan had two players record a double-double in the same game. Michigan took its first lead of the game with 16:15 remaining in the game. Minnesota then obtained its largest lead of the game at ten points five minutes later. On February 6, Livers was sidelined in the second minute of play, as Michigan was upset by Northwestern  52–61. Michigan was led by Wagner with 20 points and nine rebounds, one rebound shy of his second consecutive double-double. On February 11, Michigan reached 20 wins with an 83–72 victory over Wisconsin. Michigan was led by Wagner with 20 points and 11 rebounds, for his seventh double-double of his career. Michigan rode a 22-point half time lead to victory as Robinson returned to the starting lineup, where he recorded 14 points and made four three-point shots in the first half. After missing the better part of two games, Livers returned to the starting lineup on February 14, as Michigan defeated Iowa for a second time by a 74–59 margin. The team posted a season-high 13 steals, including a season-high four from Wagner and three from his backup Jon Teske. Robinson posted a season-high six three-point shots, giving him 18 points, while Abdur-Rahkman contributed 18 points with a season-high seven assists. With his six three-pointers, Robinson surpassed Zack Novak for sixth all-time on Michigan's career three-point leaderboard with 215 for his career. On February 18, Michigan defeated (#8 AP Poll/#9 Coaches Poll) Ohio State 74–62 in their final home game of the regular season. Michigan was led by Abdur Rahkman with 17 points. Prior to the game Michigan honored seniors Abdur-Rahkman, and Robinson, graduate student Jaaron Simmons and undergraduate student assistant Austin Hatch during senior day. On February 21 Michigan defeated Penn State 72–63. Robinson led the way with 19 points off the bench and the team had a season-high 84 percent free throw percentage, which included going 9-for-10 in the final minute of the game. On February 24, Michigan defeated Maryland 85–61 in the final game of the regular season. Michigan was led by Abdur-Rahkman with a career-high 28 points, including 22 points in the first half. Michigan's 24-point victory was the worst home loss for Maryland since the 1997–98 Terrapins lost to Duke by 32 points in 1998. The win was the Wolverines' first win at Maryland since 1937.

Postseason

Big Ten tournament
On March 1, Michigan opened its 2018 Big Ten Conference men's basketball tournament play with a 77–71 overtime victory over Iowa. Michigan survived a rough shooting night (56% on free throws and 16% three-point field goals) and foul trouble (Wagner and Abdur-Rahkman fouled out) to get the victory. Matthews led the way with 16 points, but Robinson made the go ahead three point shot with 2:17 remaining in overtime and the sank two free throws to give Michigan a two-possession lead with 10 seconds remaining.

The next day, Michigan defeated Nebraska 77–58 in the quarterfinals of the Big Ten tournament. Michigan was led by Abdur-Rahkman with 21 points, while Wagner recorded his seventh double-double of the season with 20 points and 13 rebounds. Michigan's defense held Nebraska to just 30% shooting for the game (16-of-53), including 1-of-20 during a 13:32 stretch in the first half. Robinson scored his 1,000th career point on his second 3-point field goal of the first half. Abdur-Rahkman (5–5) became the second player in the history of the Big Ten Conference men's basketball tournament to be perfect on at least 5 three-point shots in a single game. On March 3, Michigan defeated (#2 AP Poll/#2 Coaches Poll) Michigan State 75–64 in the semifinals of the Big Ten tournament. With the win, Michigan advanced to the Big Ten tournament final for the second consecutive season, and snapped Michigan State's 13-game winning streak. Michigan was led by Abdur-Rahkman, Simpson and Wagner with 15 points each. Wagner scored his 1,000th career point in the second half of the game, becoming the 54th Wolverine to reach the milestone.

On March 4, Michigan defeated (#8 AP Poll/#8 Coaches Poll) Purdue 75–66 to claim their second consecutive Big Ten tournament championship. They became the first fifth seed to win the championship and the first team to win consecutive tournament championships since Ohio State in 2010 and 2011. Michigan was led by Wagner with a team-high 17 points, and was named tournament MVP, while Abdur-Rahkman recorded 15 points and was named to the All-Tournament Team.

NCAA tournament
On March 15, Michigan began their participation in the 2018 NCAA tournament with a 61–47 victory over Montana in the first round. Michigan was led by Matthews with 20 points and a career-tying 11 rebounds, for his fourth double-double of the season. After Montana jumped out to an early 10–0 lead, Michigan's defense held Montana to just 32.1% shooting for the game, including 1-of-14 during a ten-minute stretch to start the second half. The second half was delayed for over 10 minutes with 17:53 remaining when the shot clocks lost power.

On March 17, Michigan defeated (#21 AP Poll/#19 Coaches Poll) Houston 64–63 in the second round, following a game-winning buzzer beater three-point shot by Poole as time expired. Abdur-Rahkman and Wagner led the scoring with 12 points each. There were 17 lead changes and 12 ties during the game, while neither team ever led by more than six points. With the win, Michigan advanced to its fourth Sweet 16 in six years. On March 22, Michigan defeated Texas A&M 99–72 in the regional semifinals. Abdur-Rahkman led with 24 points, while Wagner added 21 points, and Matthews 18 points. Michigan made 10 of its 14 three-pointers in the first half to take a 52–28 lead at halftime. Eight different Wolverines made a three-point field goal, setting a program record for most players to make one in an NCAA tournament game. Michigan posted 12 steals, including a career-high six by Simpson, which tied a Michigan NCAA tournament record. Michigan's 99 points were the sixth most in program history in the NCAA tournament, and the most they've scored since scoring 102 against East Tennessee in 1992. Michigan's 61.9% shooting was its second-best in program history in the NCAA tournament. With the win, Michigan advanced to its third Elite Eight in six years.

On March 24, Michigan defeated Florida State 58–54 in the regional finals. Michigan was led by Matthews with 17 points. With the win, Michigan advances to the Final Four for the eighth time in program history and for the first time since 2013. Michigan set a single-season program record with its 32nd victory of the season, surpassing the previous record of 31 wins set by the 1992–93 and 2012–13 teams. Michigan's defense held Florida State to just 23.3% (7-of-30) shooting in the second half. Matthews was named West Region Most Outstanding Player and was joined on the West Region All-tournament team by Wagner and Abdur-Rahkman. With the Wolverines men's basketball team advancing to the Final Four and the 2017–18 Michigan Wolverines men's ice hockey team advancing to the Frozen Four, it was the fourth time that both programs made their respective final four tournaments during the same season, and just the sixth time overall.

On March 31, Michigan defeated Loyola–Chicago 69–57 in the national semifinals. Michigan was led by Wagner with 24 points and a career-high 15 rebounds, for his eighth double-double of the season, while Matthews added 17 points. Wagner became the third player with at least 20 points and 15 rebounds in a national semifinal game, and the first to do so since Hakeem Olajuwon in 1983. Michigan thus advanced to its seventh national championship game, and first since 2013, and set a single season record with its 33rd victory.

On April 2, Michigan lost to (#2 Coaches Poll/#2 AP Poll) Villanova 62–79 in the National Championship Game. The loss snapped Michigan's 14-game win streak that dated back to February 6, and was the longest active winning streak in the nation. This was Michigan's longest winning streak since winning the first 16 games to start the 2012–13 season. Michigan was led by Abdur-Rahkman with 23 points, who finished his collegiate career as Michigan's all-time leader in games played with 144 games. Wagner was Michigan's only representative on the Final Four All-Tournament Team.

Schedule and results
The team's motto that could be seen on some of the team's athleticwear was "Do More, Say Less", which was the name of a song by Ann Arbor rapper P. L. that pays tribute to the team.

|-
!colspan="12" style="background:#; color:#;"|Exhibition

|-
!colspan="12" style="background:#; color:#;"| Regular season

|-
!colspan=9 style="background:#;"|Big Ten tournament

|-
!colspan=9 style="background:#;"|NCAA tournament

Roster

Coaching staff

Support Staff
Chris Hunter – Director of Basketball Operations
Chinedu Nwachukwu – Director of Player Personnel
Bryan Smothers – Video Analyst
Devon Mulry – Graduate Manager

Rankings

Statistics
The team posted the following statistics:

Honors
Following the season, Wagner was a second team All-Big Ten selection by the coaches and the media; Abdur-Rahkman was an honorable mention selection by both the coaches and the media; and Robinson was named the All-Big Ten Sixth Man of the Year by the coaches. Wagner was an All-District selection by the U.S. Basketball Writers Association based upon voting from its national membership. Wagner was an All-District selection by the U.S. Basketball Writers Association based upon voting from its national membership. He was a second team selection in the Big Ten by the National Association of Basketball Coaches. The team had five members earn Academic All-Big Ten honors for maintaining a 3.0 grade point average: Austin Davis, Matthews. Robinson, Jaaron Simmons, and Wagner. Wagner was the Most Outstanding Player of the Big Ten tournament and Abdur-Rahkman was on the All-Tournament team. In the NCAA tournament, Matthews was named West Region Most Outstanding Player and was joined by Wagner and Abdur-Rahkman on the West Region All-tournament team. Wagner was named to the Final Four All-Tournament Team.

Team players drafted into the NBA
Wagner was drafted with the 25th pick in the first round of the 2018 NBA draft, becoming Michigan's 27th first round selection and 7th under head coach Beilein. He was the fourth and final 2017–18 Big Ten Conference player drafted in the first round of the 2018 draft, and the fourth of eight drafted overall in the draft.

Sources:

See also

2018 in Michigan
List of Michigan Wolverines men's basketball seasons
Michigan Wolverines men's basketball

References

Michigan Wolverines men's basketball seasons
Michigan
Michigan
Michigan
Michigan
NCAA Division I men's basketball tournament Final Four seasons
Big Ten men's basketball tournament championship seasons